Knokke-Heist is a municipality in the Belgian province of West Flanders. The municipality comprises the towns of Heist-aan-Zee, Knokke, Duinbergen, Ramskapelle and Westkapelle. On January 1, 2006 Knokke-Heist had a total population of 34,063. The total area is 56.44 km² which gives a population density of 603 inhabitants per km².  Knokke-Heist is located along the North Sea in a polder area on the Belgian border with the Netherlands.  It is Belgium’s best-known and most affluent seaside resort.

History

Middle Ages

Originally, the marshy Zwin area was mostly settled by shepherds and fishermen.  With the encouragement of the Counts of Flanders, several dikes were built between the 11th and the 13th century and the land successfully dewatered, giving rise to agriculture and further sheep breeding.  New parishes were founded and the early settlement of Sint-Anna-ter-Muiden, later made part of Westkapelle, obtained city rights in 1242.

The strategic importance of the Zwin harbour was recognized in 1301, during the war between Count Guy of Dampierre and the French King Philip the Fair.  During the Hundred Years' War that followed shortly after, several battles were fought between France and England for supremacy of the area including the Battle of Sluys in June 1340.  The local population tried to remain neutral as it was politically tied to Flanders, then allied to France, but economically dependent on wool from England.  Under Philip the Bold’s leadership, it took advantage of the relative peace of the end of the century to fortify the canal linking the Zwin to the port of Bruges.

15th to 17th century
The beginning of the 15th century witnessed several renewed English attacks on neighboring Sluis, with devastating effects on the local economy, until a lasting peace was signed in 1439.  The end of the century was marked by internal rebellions against Maximilian of Austria and strategic flooding of the polders.  The reign of Charles V in the following century saw peace coming back to the region.  This was also the time when the Zwin started silting and when apple orchards were planted to supplement the local economy.

The Wars of Religion of the late 16th century brought renewed floods and devastation, but the economy managed to come back to life after the Peace of Westphalia with the cultivation of rapeseed and potatoes.  The strength of this agricultural rebirth and of the cattle trade allowed the local farmers to weather future economic crises relatively well.

18th century until today
Following the Treaty of Utrecht in 1713, the territory of Knokke was annexed to the Netherlands, but the old border was reestablished at the Zwin a few years later.  After the Battle of Fleurus (1794), Bruges, Knokke and the neighboring municipalities were included in the department of the Lys.  The construction of the Leopold Canal in 1857 made the closing of the Zwin and its transformation in a natural reservation possible.  The development of Knokke and Heist as tourist destinations followed soon after.  The population of Knokke doubled between 1873 and 1914 to 3,326 inhabitants, then again from 1914 to 1930 and again to reach more than 14,000 in 1965 despite the heavy setbacks brought by World War II.

Notable sights

The area known as Het Zoute (Le Zoute in French) includes the exclusive Royal Zoute Golf Club, located in the dunes.
The Zwin, a 158 ha coastal nature reserve.  This large salt-water marsh area is also a protected bird sanctuary.
The Sincfala museum, located in Heist, documents the regional history and way of life. 
A butterfly garden (Vlindertuin) was established near Moeder Siska, the coffeehouse that makes clover-shaped waffles which dates from 1892. Both closed in 2010.
Scharpoord, a concert hall
"De groetende mannen", translated to "the men greeting (each other)", a sculpture by Joep van Lieshout of two large orange men shaking hands
The sculpture of Alfred Verwee located in front of the town hall
The sculpture located on the beach of Knokke-Heist. There are many sculptures in Knokke-Heist located on the beach and on the wave breakers.
The pink fountain located at the tourism center.
The sculpture of a blue floating water faucet built by the municipal water company.
The sculpture of a rabbit located at the end of the boardwalk.

Events, sports and culture
Knokke-Heist is home to more than 40 art galleries.
The Kneistival, a free and week-long music festival, has taken place every July since 1986.
Festival international du cinéma expérimental de Knokke-le-Zoute (Experimental Film festival)
Knokke-Heist is home to the Cartoon Festival of Knokke-Heist, which is an art gallery open in the summer located on the beach in front of the casino in which cartoons for adults and children are presented.
Knokke-Heist host a carnaval every year at the end of February.
The Belgian Basketball Supercup is held in Knokke-Heist.
The Belgian Volleyball Supercup is also held in Knokke-Heist.
Miss Belgian beauty is Belgian beauty pageant held in Knokke-Heist.
The Zwin Triathlon at the end of September.

Inhabitants
Günther Vanaudenaerde, defense football player (1984-)
David Van Ooteghem, radio presenter (1975-)

Gallery

See also
Belgian Coast Tram
Knokke railway station

Notes

External links

Official website - Information available in Dutch, French, English and German
Sincfala museum - Information on local history and on the Zwin area, available in Dutch only
KH Magazine - Official website of the community magazine KH, including a complete activity calendar Dutch, French

 
Municipalities of West Flanders
Port cities and towns of the North Sea
Seaside resorts in Belgium